Silkwood is a rural town and locality in the Cassowary Coast Region, Queensland, Australia.

Geography 
Silkwood is situated on the Bruce Highway roughly halfway between Tully and Innisfail.

The locality is flat land about 10 metres above sea level and is predominantly freehold land used for farming, particularly the cultivation of sugarcane. The north-western border of the locality is Liverpool Creek, which flows eastward to the Coral Sea. The town is roughly central in the locality with the Bruce Highway passing from south to north just east of the town, while the North Coast railway line also passes from south to north through the town, which is serviced by the Silkwood railway station.

History 

The town takes its name from the name of the house of  A. J. Daveson, and refers to a local timber.

Silkwood State School opened on 28 August 1916.

Silkwood was the site of significant Italian immigration in the 1940s.

On Sunday 15 December 1940, Roman Catholic Bishop of Cairns, John Heavey, laid the foundation stone for a church to be dedicated to St John the Evangelist. He returned on Sunday 3 August 1941 to perform the blessing and opening of the Gothic-style church. The early priests at the church were Scalabrinians, followed by Augustinian priests. The Silkwood parish was established in 1946.

St John's Catholic School was founded by the parish priest Father Alfred Natali and the Missionary Franciscan Sisters. It opened on 2 February 1948 with students mostly from Italian families who worked in the local sugarcane industry. The Sisters left the school in 1987, being replaced by lay teachers.

In the  the locality of Silkwood had a population of 391 people.

Education 

Silkwood State School is a government primary (Prep-6) school for boys and girls at Japoon Road. In 2015,  the school had an enrolment of 60 students with 7 teachers (4 full-time equivalent) and 6 non-teaching staff (4 full-time equivalent) with the students divided into 3 classes, years P-2, 3-4, and 5-6. In 2018, the school had an enrolment of 62 students with 6 teachers (4 full-time equivalent) and 7 non-teaching staff (4 full-time equivalent).

St John's School is a Catholic primary (Prep-6) school for boys and girls at Harold Street. It is operated by the Roman Catholic Diocese of Cairns. In 2016, the school had 64 students with 8 teachers (7 full-time equivalent) and 8 non-teaching staff (3 full-time equivalent). In 2018, the school had an enrolment of 67 students with 9 teachers (7 full-time equivalent) and 8 non-teaching staff (4 full-time equivalent).

The nearest secondary schools are in Innisfail and Tully.

Amenities 
The Silkwood branch of the Queensland Country Women's Association meets at 9 Silkwood Jappon Road.

St John the Evangelist Catholic Church is in Harold Street. It is within the Silkwood Parish of the Roman Catholic Diocese of Cairns.

Attractions 

Silkwood Castle is at 18 Margaret Street. Engineer John Nielsen retired to Silkwood and, in 2009, commenced building himself a home. It was an imposing whitewashed concrete structure, intended to be something different, which has been described variously looking like a "Disney fairytale" and a "mosque". He worked on it for over 20 years until his death.

The former National Australia Bank building in Silkwood is claimed to be the smallest bank building in Australia. It was opened in the 1930s and continued to trade until 1999. It is now a small museum.

Events 

On the first Sunday of May, Silkwood celebrates the annual Feast of the Three Saints: St Alfio, St Filadelfo and St Cerino. In 1939, Silkwood resident Alfia Tornabene (née Patti) had just given birth to a daughter in Innisfail Hospital, becoming seriously ill. Her husband Rosario dreamt of the three saints who reassured him his wife would recover, leading Rosario to vow that he would bring statues of the saints from Sicily to Silkwood if his wife recovered. His wife recovered and in 1947-1948 he organised for an old artisan in Giarre, Sicily, to carve the statues from cherry trees near his family's farm in Sicily as recreations of the statues in the main church of Sant'Alfio in Sicily. The first celebration of the feast in Silkwood was in 1950. The festival typically consists of a Mass, a procession of the statues through the streets accompanied by bands, feasting, music, dancing and fireworks.

References

Further reading

External links

 Unofficial Silkwood site
 Feast of the Three Saints
 Town plan, 1975

Towns in Queensland
Cassowary Coast Region
Localities in Queensland